BAP Islay (SS-35) is one of two Type 209/1100 submarines ordered by the Peruvian Navy on 24 June 1970. She was built by the German shipbuilder Howaldtswerke Deutsche Werft AG at its shipyard in Kiel. She is named after the Battle of Islay which took place between naval forces of Peru and Chile on 12 January 1838. Following sea trials in the North Sea, she arrived to its homeport of Callao in 1974. After almost a decade in service she was overhauled in Kiel in 1983 for further use.

Sources
Baker III, Arthur D., The Naval Institute Guide to Combat Fleets of the World 2002-2003. Naval Institute Press, 2002.
Ortiz Sotelo, Jorge, Apuntes para la historia de los submarinos peruanos. Biblioteca Nacional, 2001.

 

1973 ships
Type 209 submarines of the Peruvian Navy
Ships built in Kiel